Take It Like You Give It is the ninth studio album by American singer Aretha Franklin, released in 1967 by Columbia Records.

Track listing
Side One
"Why Was I Born?" (Oscar Hammerstein II, Jerome Kern) – 2:52
"I May Never Get to Heaven" (Buddy Killen, Bill Anderson) – 3:27
"Tighten Up Your Tie, Button Up Your Jacket (Make It Easy for the Door)" (Billy Dawn Smith) – 1:58
"Her Little Heart Went to Loveland" (Buddy Kaye, Philip Springer) – 2:34
"Lee Cross" (Ted White) – 2:53
"Take It Like You Give It" (Aretha Franklin) – 1:50
Side Two
"Only the One You Love" (Eddie Snyder, Charles Singleton) – 2:23
"Deeper" (Rudy Clark) – 2:03
"Remember Me" (Van McCoy, Clyde Otis) – 2:12
"Land of Dreams" (Aretha Franklin) – 2:12
"A Little Bit of Soul" (Milton Bland, McKinley Mitchell, David Wilkinson) – 2:18

Personnel
Robert Mersey - conductor on "Why Was I Born?", "Tighten Up Your Tie, Button Up Your Jacket (Make It for the Door)" and "Lee Cross", producer on "Lee Cross"
Belford Hendricks - conductor on "Land of Dreams" and "A Little Bit of Soul"
Bob Johnston - producer on "Why Was I Born?" and "Tighten Up Your Tie, Button Up Your Jacket (Make It for the Door)"
Bobby Scott - producer on "I May Never Get to Heaven"
Clyde Otis - producer on tracks A4, A6, B1 to B5
Vernon Smith - cover photography

References

Aretha Franklin albums
1967 albums
Albums produced by Bob Johnston
Columbia Records albums